The Maria Konopnicka Monument in Września (Polish: Pomnik Marii Konopnickiej we Wrześni) is a bronze statue located in the town of Września, Greater Poland Region, and dedicated to Maria Konopnicka (1842–1910), a Polish poet, novelist, children's writer and activist for women's rights and for Polish independence.

History
The monument was designed by sculptor Mieczysław Welter and officially unveiled in 1979. The bronze cast of the statute was made in the Pomet Metallurgy Works in Poznań (Zakłady Metalurgiczne "Pomet" w Poznaniu). The location of the monument was chosen to pay tribute to the poet for her support and defence of the schoolchildren participating in the Września School Strike against the policy of Germanization in the years 1901–1904. The monument was erected on the initiative of and funded by the inhabitants of Września. It is currently situated in the Children of Września Park. Near the monument, eight bronze sculptures of books designed by Poznań-born sculptor and medallist Józef Stasiński, have been located.

Gallery

See also
History of Poland (1795–1918)

References

1979 sculptures
Sculptures of women
Sculptures in Poland
Sculptures of women in Poland
Outdoor sculptures in Poland
Monuments and memorials in Poland